A "leap of faith" is the act of trusting someone or something, despite apparent counter evidence.

Leap of Faith may also refer to:

Film, theater, and television
 Leap of Faith (film), a 1992 American comedy-drama film
 Leap of Faith (musical), a 2010 stage musical based on the 1992 film
 Leap of Faith (TV series), a 2002 American sitcom

Television episodes
 "Leap of Faith" (Arrow)
 "Leap of Faith" (Blue Bloods)
 "Leap of Faith" (Full House)
 "Leap of Faith" (Melrose Place 1992)
 "Leap of Faith" (My Little Pony: Friendship Is Magic)
 "Leap of Faith" (NCIS)
 "Leap of Faith" (Third Watch)
 Hollyoaks: Leap of Faith, a 2003 late-night special episode of Hollyoaks

Literature
 Leap of Faith: Memoirs of an Unexpected Life, a 2003 book by Queen Noor of Jordan
 Leap of Faith, a 2000 autobiography by Gordon Cooper

Music

Albums
 Leap of Faith (Dave Douglas album) or the title song, 2000
 Leap of Faith (Kenny Loggins album) or the title song, 1991
 Leap of Faith (Shooting Star album) or the title song, 2000
 Leap of Faith, by Air Cuba, 1999
 Leap of Faith, by David Charvet, or the title song, 2002
 Leap of Faith, by Jean-Paul 'Bluey' Maunick, 2013
 Leap of Faith, by Timothy B. Schmit, 2016

Songs
 "Leap of Faith" (Hadouken! song), 2007
 "Leap of Faith" (Lionel Cartwright song), 1991
 "Leap of Faith", by Big & Rich from Comin' to Your City, 2005
 "Leap of Faith", by Bruce Springsteen from Lucky Town, 1992
 "Leap of Faith", by Egypt Central from Egypt Central, 2005
 "Leap of Faith", by Hale from Above, Over and Beyond, 2008
 "Leap of Faith", by R. Kelly from Happy People/U Saved Me, 2004

Other uses
 Leap of Faith (skate), a 14 foot, 3 inch drop at Point Loma High School, California, US
 Leap of faith, a distinctive move in the Assassin's Creed video game series